The Kardashian family, also referred to as the Kardashian–Jenner family, is an American family prominent in the fields of entertainment, reality television, fashion design, and business. Through different ventures, several members of the family have assets of over a billion dollars. Kim Kardashian became a celebrity in the early 2000s, which enabled the family as a whole to rise to stardom in 2007 when they appeared together on the highly popular reality television show Keeping Up with the Kardashians. The show's 14-year run gave and maintained media exposure to each member of the family, allowing them to start and build their individual careers in multiple businesses under their own separate brand.

Founded by (née Houghton), it consists of their children Kourtney, Kim, Khloé, and Rob Kardashian, as well as their grandchildren. After Robert and Kris' divorce in 1991, Kris married Olympic decathlon champion Caitlyn Jenner (then known as Bruce) with whom she had two daughters: Kendall and Kylie Jenner. Notable extended relatives include Kendall and Kylie's half-siblings (through Caitlyn and her marriage to actress Linda Thompson), Brandon and Brody Jenner.

Kourtney previously dated American entrepreneur Scott Disick; they have three children. In 2022, she married Travis Barker. Kim was married to American rapper and record producer Kanye West; they have four children. Khloé previously dated Canadian basketball player Tristan Thompson; they have two children.  Rob previously dated American rapper and model Blac Chyna; they have one child. Kylie is in a long-term relationship with American rapper and singer Travis Scott; they have two children.

Robert initially received attention for being one of O. J. Simpson's lawyers during the O. J. Simpson murder case, but the family parlayed Kim's 2003 sex tape with singer Ray J, Kim Kardashian, Superstar, into a reality-TV and business empire. They have since been referred to as "America's most famous family" by Glamour, "one of the most influential family 'dynasties' in the world" by Insider, and the biggest influencers of the 2010s by Vogue. They are the focus of the book Kardashian Dynasty: The Controversial Rise of America's Royal Family by Ian Halperin.

Best known for its involvement in reality television shows, the family's longest running show was Keeping Up with the Kardashians (2007–2021). Spinoffs included Kourtney and Kim Take Miami (2009–2013); Kourtney and Khloé Take Miami (2009–2013); Kourtney and Kim Take New York (2011–2012); Khloé & Lamar (2013); Kourtney and Kim Take Miami (2014–2015); Kourtney and Khloé Take The Hamptons (2014–2015); Dash Dolls (2015) and Life of Kylie (2017). In 2022, the family debuted their new series The Kardashians.

Family background
Robert Kardashian Sr. is the son of Helen and Arthur Kardashian. All four of his grandparents were Armenian who emigrated from the Russian Empire to the United States in the early 20th century, originating from the towns of Karakale and Erzurum in modern-day Turkey. The family left the Russian Empire before the Armenian genocide began in 1915.

Reception
The family and media give Kim the credit for helping them start their careers. The family has been criticized as being famous for being famous. In late May 2020, Forbes released an investigation into Kylie's finances, alleging she misrepresented her billionaire status. Writers Chase Peterson-Withorn and Madeline Berg stated, "...white lies, omissions and outright fabrications are to be expected from the family that perfected—then monetized—the concept of 'famous for being famous.'" Even with the family's mainstay show Keeping up with the Kardashians, some have said the family has "no real skills beyond 'being famous for being famous.'" Vogue stated the Kardashians have "...proved that although they were 'famous for being famous' in the 2000s, in the 2010s they became a cultural force to be reckoned with." They were given keys to Beverly Hills on September 2, 2010, intentionally arranged to match the area's zip code of 90210. The family are often criticized for blackfishing and cultural appropriation of African-American culture.

Family trees

Kardashian family tree

Tatos Saghatel Kardashian†,  Hamas Shakarian†
 Arthur Kardashian†,  Helen Arakelian†
Robert Kardashian† ( February 22, 1944), formerly married to Kris Houghton ( November 5, 1955)
Kourtney Kardashian ( April 18, 1979), formerly partnered with Scott Disick ( May 26, 1983), later married to Travis Barker ( November 14, 1975)
Mason Dash Disick ( December 14, 2009)
Penelope Scotland Disick ( July 8, 2012)
Reign Aston Disick ( December 14, 2014)
Kim Kardashian ( October 21, 1980), formerly married to Kanye West ( June 8, 1977)
North West ( June 15, 2013)
Saint West ( December 5, 2015)
Chicago West ( January 15, 2018)
Psalm West ( May 10, 2019)
Khloé Kardashian ( June 27, 1984), formerly partnered with Tristan Thompson ( March 13, 1991)
True Thompson ( April 12, 2018)
Baby Thompson ( July 28, 2022)
Rob Kardashian ( March 17, 1987), formerly partnered with Blac Chyna ( May 11, 1988)
Dream Renée Kardashian ( November 10, 2016)
Barbara Kardashian Freeman†
Thomas "Tom" Kardashian,  Joan "Joanie" Roberts (formerly Esposito)

Kardashian–Jenner family tree

William Hugh Jenner†  Esther Ruth McGuire
Caitlyn Jenner ( October 28, 1949), formerly married to Kris Kardashian ( November 5, 1955)
Kendall Jenner ( November 3, 1995)
Kylie Jenner ( August 10, 1997), formerly partnered with Travis Scott ( April 30, 1991)
Stormi Webster ( February 1, 2018)
Aire Webster ( February 2, 2022)
Burt Jenner† (1958-1976)

Sources for family trees:

See also 

 List of entertainment industry dynasties
 List of show business families
 Celebrity

References

 
American families of Armenian ancestry
Business families of the United States